The Longer Bodies is a 1930 mystery detective novel by the British writer Gladys Mitchell. It is the third in her long-running series featuring the psychoanalyst and amateur detective Mrs Bradley.

Synopsis
In order to see which her relatives deserves to inherit her considerable fortune, an old lady stages a mini-Olympics in which they compete in various events. When the body of a local villager is found on the training grounds the police arrive, followed by the very persistent Mrs Bradley.

References

Bibliography
 Klein, Kathleen Gregory. Great Women Mystery Writers: Classic to Contemporary. Greenwood Press, 1994.
 Miskimmin, Esme. 100 British Crime Writers. Springer Nature, 2020.
 Reilly, John M. Twentieth Century Crime & Mystery Writers. Springer, 2015.

1930 British novels
Novels by Gladys Mitchell
British crime novels
British mystery novels
British thriller novels
Novels set in England
British detective novels
Victor Gollancz Ltd books